Turnin' Me On may refer to:

 "Turnin Me On", a 2009 song by Keri Hilson
 "Turnin' Me On" (Nina Sky song), 2005
 "Turnin' Me On" (Blake Shelton song), 2018

See also
Turning Me On (disambiguation)